This is a list of football teams based in Greater Manchester sorted by which league they play in as of the 2022–23 season. The leagues are listed in order of their level in the English football league system, and the English women's football league system.

Men's teams

Levels 1–4

These clubs play in fully professional leagues, at levels 1–4 of the English football league system as of the 2022–23 season.

Levels 5–8

These clubs play in semi-professional and amateur leagues, at levels 5–8 of the English football league system as of the 2022–23 season.

Levels 9–10
These Greater Manchester clubs play in semi-pro and amateur leagues which grant eligibility to enter the FA Vase and are high enough in the English football league system to grant eligibility to enter the FA Cup, comprising levels 9–10 of the system. In Greater Manchester this consists solely of the North West Counties Football League.

Levels 11–12
These Greater Manchester clubs play in amateur leagues, levels 11–12. This includes the Manchester League, the Cheshire Football League, and the West Lancashire Football League.

Cheshire League
Premier Division
Altrincham Reserves
Broadheath Central
Denton Town
Winstanley Warriors
Whalley Range
Winstanley Warriors

League 1
Cheadle Heath Nomads Reserves
Denton Town
Golborne Sports
Maine Road Reserves
Wythenshawe Amateurs Reserves

Manchester League
Premier Division
Atherton Town
Bolton County
Chadderton Reserves
Dukinfield Town
Heyside
Heywood St James
Hindsford
Manchester Gregorians
Moorside Rangers
Old Altrinchamians
Pennington
Rochdale Sacred Heart
Royton Town
Springhead
Uppermill
Walshaw Sports

Division One
AFC Monton
Altrincham Hale
Avenue
Avro Reserves
Bolton Borough
Bolton Lads and Girls
Bolton United
Boothstown
East Manchester
Elton Vale
Govan and Uni of Manchester
Hindley Juniors
Manchester Central

West Lancashire League
Division One
Eagley

Women's teams

Levels 1–4

These clubs play in fully professional leagues, at levels 1–4 of the English women's football league system as of the 2022–23 season.

Levels 5–6

North West Women's Regional Football League
Premier Division (Level 5)

Bury
F.C. United of Manchester
Manchester Stingers
Mossley Hill Athletic
Wigan Athletic

Division One North (Level 6)

Leigh Genesis

Division One South (Level 6)

Altrincham
Curzon Ashton
Salford City Lionesses
Wythenshawe Amateurs

Levels 7–8

Greater Manchester Women's Football League
Division One (Level 7)

 Ashton United
 Didsbury FC
 Heyside Ladies FC
 Langho Ladies
 Mosley AFC Ladies 
 Rochdale AFC Ladies
 Sale Ladies
 Tameside United
 Urmston Meadowside
 West Didsbury and Chorlton Women

Division Two (Level 8)

 AFC Lionesses
 AFC Oldham Ladies
 Bolton Lads & Girls Club Ladies
 Boltonians Ladies
 Crompton FC Ladies
 Flixton Ladies
 Mancunian Unity Women
 Stockport Lionesses
 Swinton FC Ladies
 Walshaw Sports
 Greater Manchester FC

See also
Football in Manchester

Notes

References

Greater Manchester
 
Football clubs